Koub is a khum (commune) of Ou Chrov District in Banteay Meanchey Province in north-western Cambodia.

Villages

 Yeang thmei(យាងថ្មី)
 Mak Heun(ម៉ក់ហឺន)
 Veang Muong(វាំងមួង)
 Koub Kaeut(កូបកើត)
 Khai Dan(ខៃដន)
 Naka Chhay(ណាកាឆាយ)
 Koub Lech(កូបលិច)
 Koub Cheung(កូបជើង)
 Ou Chrov(អូរជ្រៅ)
 Souriya(សុរិយា)
 Koun Trei(កូនត្រី)

References

Communes of Banteay Meanchey province
Ou Chrov District